The 19577/19578 Tirunelveli–Jamnagar Express is an express train operated by Indian Railways that runs between  and  in India. It is currently being operated with 19577/19578 train numbers on bi-weekly basis.

Coach composition

The train has standard ICF rakes with max speed of 110 kmph. The train consists of 23 coaches :

 1 AC II Tier
 5 AC III Tier
 10 Sleeper Coaches
 1 Pantry Car
 4 General
 2 Seating cum Luggage Rake

Service

The 19577/Tirunelveli–Jamnagar Express has an average speed of 55 km/hr and covers 2434 km in 44 hrs 25 mins.

The 19578/Jamnagar–Tirunelveli Express has an average speed of 54 km/hr and covers 2434 km in 45 hrs 00 mins.

Route & halts

The 19577/19578 Tirunelveli–Jamnagar Express runs from  via , 
,

Schedule

Traction

It is now hauled by Arakkonam based WAP 4 to till Mangaluru Junction, after which an Vatva based WDM-3D takes the train towards the remaining part of the journey till Jamnagar.

References 

Transport in Jamnagar
Transport in Tirunelveli
Rail transport in Gujarat
Rail transport in Maharashtra
Rail transport in Goa
Rail transport in Karnataka
Rail transport in Kerala
Rail transport in Tamil Nadu
Railway services introduced in 2010